"Moments Passed" is a song by Irish singer-songwriter and musician Dermot Kennedy. It was released as a single on 19 September 2017. The song features on his compilation album, Dermot Kennedy, his debut studio album Without Fear, and EP Mike Dean Presents: Dermot Kennedy. The song was written by Carey Willetts, Dermot Kennedy, Micheál Quinn and Stephen Kozmeniuk.

Critical reception
Niall Byrne from The Irish Times, gave the song a positive review stating, "Built on a twisted vocal sample with a clear Dublin accent, the local boy Dermot Kennedy fuses a singer-songwriter sensibility with modern production techniques to create a sound that is at once reaching and intimate. Kennedy is working with an international team already so it seems likely we’ll be hearing much more from him."

Music video
A music video to accompany the release of "Moments Passed" was first released onto YouTube on 5 December 2017. The music video was directed by NABIL.

Personnel
Credits adapted from Tidal.
 Carey Willetts – producer, composer, lyricist
 Manny Marroquin – mixer, studio personnel
 Dermot Kennedy – composer, lyricist
 Micheál Quinn – composer, lyricist
 Stephen Kozmeniuk – composer, lyricist

Charts

Certifications

Release history

References

2017 songs
2017 singles
Dermot Kennedy songs
Songs written by Stephen Kozmeniuk
Songs written by Carey Willetts
Songs written by Dermot Kennedy